In late 2022, various media outlets around the world reported on a suspected attempt by the People's Republic of China to infiltrate the Parliament of Canada by funding a network of candidates to run in the country’s 2019 federal election.

Advanced warnings
In June 2017, the Canadian National Security Advisor drafted a Memorandum for the Prime Minister, advising Prime Minister Justin Trudeau that Chinese agents were "assisting Canadian candidates running for political offices." This document, which was copied to the Clerk of the Privy Council, went on to say that officials had documented evidence of China attempting to infiltrate "all levels of government" and alleged that, “[t]here is a substantial body of evidence that Chinese officials are actively pursuing a strategy of engagement to influence Canadian officials in ways that can compromise the security of Canada and the integrity of Canadian institutions.”

Trudeau received a classified report from the National Security and Intelligence Committee of Parliamentarians (NSICOP) in August 2019; it warned that public officials across all levels of government were being targeted and the government had been "slow to react to the threat of foreign interference" and "must do better". A redacted copy of the report was subsequently released in March 2020.

Security officials reportedly gave an "urgent, classified briefing" to Liberal Party officials three weeks before the federal election in 2019, "warning them that one of their candidates was part of a Chinese foreign interference network"—referring to Han Dong—but, this was ignored by the Liberal Party.

Alleged interference during 2019 election 

The alleged plot to infiltrate the 2019 election was made public through a November 7, 2022, investigative report by Global News.

Sources for the report said that a Chinese Communist Party (CCP) proxy group mobilized around CA$250,000 to fund the infiltration network through a staffer for an election candidate and a member of the Legislative Assembly of Ontario, who both acted as intermediaries. Recipients of the donations included at least 11 candidates and members of their campaign staff, 13 or more federal aides, an Ontario MPP, and unelected public officials according to a January 2022 Privy Council Office "Special Report." The PCO "Special Report" was prepared from information derived from 100 Canadian Security Intelligence Service (CSIS) documents. The sources also said that the candidates were members of Canada’s two main political parties (the Liberal Party of Canada and Conservative Party of Canada), and that some of them were “witting affiliates of the Chinese Communist Party.”

In March 2023, Global News reported that Vincent Ke, was the Ontario MPP alleged to have served as a financial intermediary for the Chinese consulate as part of election interference efforts. On the same day, Ke denied the allegations and resigned from his role as parliamentary secretary and from the Ontario PC caucus to sit as an independent.

Alleged interference during 2021 election 

A year following the 2021 Canadian federal election, Conservative Party politicians, including former leader Erin O'Toole, blamed Chinese government interference as a factor behind the loss for the party. In a 2022 interview on the UnCommons podcast with Nathaniel Erskine-Smith, O'Toole opined that media outfits linked to the CCP could have cost the Conservatives up to "eight or nine seats." The Conservative Party believes that their candidates were targeted by foreign interference in 13 federal ridings. The Conservative party was regularly briefed by CSIS on foreign interference during the 2021 election campaign. The party believes that foreign influence included foreign government-paid campaign workers, illegal advertising, and manipulation and misinformation on social media including WeChat and Weibo.

O'Toole's beliefs were supported by Conservative MP and foreign affairs critic Michael Chong who stated that while the party was initially hesitant to blame China for influencing the vote due to inconclusive evidence at the time, he now believed, "The communist leadership in Beijing did interfere in the last federal election by spreading disinformation through proxies on Chinese-language social media platforms that contributed to the defeat of a number of Conservative MPs", citing a report by McGill University. Similar views were shared by O'Toole's director of parliamentary affairs Mitch Heimpel, who claimed Canadian national security officers had contacted the Conservatives around election day to express concerns about potential foreign interference. Heimpel also cited the example of former Conservative MP Kenny Chiu who had been targeted by a misinformation campaign on the Chinese social media platform WeChat. Research into alleged electoral interference by McGill University indicated that there was no specific data to draw a full conclusion on the impact of potential interference and noted, "Canadian-Chinese issues were not central to the campaign nor were they top of mind for voters" but concurred that researchers had found Chinese state media had worked "with an apparent aim to convince Canadians of Chinese origin to vote against the Conservative Party."

Parties reportedly involved

Chinese Consulate in Toronto
According to the Global News report, the consulate directed the transfer of funds during the 2019 election. The report also said that a member in the consulate directed a staffer for unnamed federal election candidates to monitor and interfere with their engagement activities. The interference efforts included preventing meetings with representatives of Taiwan.

Chinese Consulate in Vancouver
According to classified CSIS reports reviewed by the Globe and Mail, China’s former consul-general in Vancouver, Tong Xiaoling, boasted in 2021 about how she helped defeat two Conservative MPs. After this was reported in the press, senior officials at Global Affairs of Canada reached out to Tong. A Jan 10, 2022, CSIS report viewed by The Globe and Mail outlined how the consulate and Tong also interfered in the 2022 Vancouver municipal election to replace the mayor and elect pro-Beijing councillors. Previous Vancouver mayor Kennedy Stewart, who was critical of the Chinese government, would like to see Ottawa expand its inquiry into Beijing’s interference in the 2019 and 2021 federal elections to municipal and provincial politics as well. Current Vancouver mayor Ken Sim denounced the accusations of interference as racially-motivated.

United Front Work Department
According to the Global News report, several candidates in the alleged 2019 election infiltration network met with officials from the CCP's United Front Work Department. CSIS’s documents said the organization’s activities in Canada has facilitated interference operations by the Ministry of State Security, China's principal civilian intelligence agency, and that its members in Canada has operated from Chinese consulates in Canada.

Aftermath 
In February 2020, four months after the 2019 election, details of the alleged Chinese infiltration network were described in a PCO report entitled "PRC Foreign Interference: 2019 Elections." The PCO report was presented to senior Liberal Party officials, and described how the Chinese Consulate in Toronto used an extensive network of community groups to conceal the flow of funds between Chinese officials and network members. “This network involves the Chinese consulate, local community leaders, Canadian politicians, and their staff,” the 2020 PCO report said. “Under broad guidance from the consulate, co-opted staff of targeted politicians provide advice on China-related issues, and community leaders facilitate the clandestine transfer of funds and recruit potential targets.”

In December 2021, a report by the CSIS that was reviewed by Global News described Chinese consulate officials as believing that “it is easy to influence Chinese immigrants to agree with PRC’s stance.” The report also claimed that “The Liberal Party of Canada is becoming the only party that the People’s Republic of China can support." The report was distributed to the CIA, FBI, as well as Australian, New Zealand and British intelligence services.

In January 2022, the suspected infiltration plot was described in detail in a report presented to Canadian Prime Minister Justin Trudeau and members of his cabinet by CSIS. CSIS reportedly did not conclude whether the suspected interference operation achieved its goals, but it did say that Canada was subject to more foreign interference attacks from China than from any other nation.

Following news report in November 2022, CSIS said they had identified PRC foreign interference in Canada, which it defined to include election interference through covert foreign political financing. Trudeau said that although China has been “continuing to play aggressive games with our institutions, with our democracies”, his government has been undertaking measures to combat “foreign interference of our democracy and institutions.” On November 9, a request was made by a cross party group of Canadian Members of Parliament to convene an emergency meeting in order to discuss the interference allegations detailed in the Global News report. Prime Minister Justin Trudeau stated in 2021 regarding the alleged plot that, "I do not have any information, nor have I been briefed on any federal candidates receiving any money from China".

In the fall of 2022, the Chinese government made a visa application for a new position at its Embassy in Ottawa. Following a review of the application by Global Affairs Canada, the department concluded that the position was "transparently not a diplomatic position", likely meant instead for a political operative. A diplomatic visa was denied.

In response to further reports in February 2023, Justin Trudeau claimed that "[he] never got briefings on candidates receiving money from China.” However, anonymous intelligence officials who spoke to Global News described years of “interactive” dialogue between senior intelligence officials and Trudeau's office regarding China’s incursions into Canadian elections. These same officials stated that the prime minister’s office has been reticent to adopt legal reforms already undertaken by Canada’s allies, and one of the officials described this inaction as "inexcusable." According to an anonymous CSIS official, “the floodgates have been opened in the last five years. There has been ample evidence placed in front of the Liberal Party of Canada, and they have done essentially nothing.”

In March 2023, Trudeau instructed NSICOP to investigate foreign interference in Canada, with a special eye on election meddling. During the press conference Trudeau admitted that his government had not acted on many of the recommendations made in previous reports from NSICOP. In its 2021 review, provided to Trudeau in May 2022, the body had asked the government to respond to the recommendations made in its previous seven reviews. In the March 2023, press conference Trudeau said that his government would now respond to those recommendations within 30 days.

On March 7, Liberal MPs filibustered an opposition motion at the Committee on Procedure and House Affairs (PROC), which sought to require the Prime Minister’s chief of staff, Katie Telford to testify concerning election interference and intelligence briefings. When the committee was to resume in the afternoon, Liberal committee members did not attend, denying the committee quorum to resume.

Faced with questions from reporters on March 8, 2023, Trudeau said "I know that no matter what I say, Canadians continue to have questions about what [the government] did and what we didn't".

Liberal members of PROC continued a filibuster the following week where they read newspaper articles into the record, talked about personal overseas travel and their university days, in order to prevent a vote on a motion to subpoena Telford. Conservative MP Michael Cooper asked the committee to vote on the motion, saying that the filibuster had already continued for "more than 14 hours, over four days". The committee meeting was suspended after 10:00 pm without the motion coming to a vote.

On March 20, Conservative MPs tabled a motion in the House of Commons to compel Telford to testify before PROC concerning election interference.

Appointment of Special Rapporteur

In March 2023, Trudeau announced that he would be appointing a special rapporteur to " make expert recommendations on protecting and enhancing Canadians’ faith in our democracy". The government said the rapporteur would be named within weeks.

On March 14, Trudeau committed to naming a special rapporteur "in the coming days or week."

On March 15, Trudeau named former governor general and friend of the Trudeau family David Johnston as independent special rapporteur "[t]asked with helping "protect the integrity of Canada's democracy."

Concerns were raised by Conservative and Bloc opposition leaders and by news media about the appointment due to Johnston's relationship with the Trudeau family, membership in the Trudeau Foundation, and state visits to China he made as governor general, at the direction of Harper in 2015 and Trudeau in 2017. Bloc Quebecois Leader Yves-Francois Blanchet responded that Trudeau appears unwilling to launch an inquiry and that he should not use the rapporteur role to keep Parliament and the general public in the dark. Trudeau claimed that all parties had been consulted prior to Johnston's appointment, but the NDP indicated that Johnston's name was not raised with them during the consultations.  Nonetheless, the NDP support Johnston's appointment.

Other alleged influence operations targeting Canadian politicians and officials
Chinese security agencies are known to try to compromise Canadian officials who travel to China. According to the 2017 “Memorandum for the Prime Minister” prepared by Trudeau's National Security Advisor, Daniel Jean, “Canadian officials are highly likely to be subjects of Chinese efforts to exert undue influence or otherwise compromise their independence during travel to China." The Chinese People's Institute of Foreign Affairs (CPIFA), which reports to the United Front Work Department, is one of the key state agencies that regularly funds trips of Canadian politicians. Between 2006 and 2017, Canadian parliamentarians took 36 trips to China sponsored by arms of the Chinese government or by Chinese-affiliated business groups.

In 2018, Ted Jiancheng Zhou, owner of Shanghai Oriental Capital Group and Evertrust Development Group Canada Inc., travelled to China with Conservative senators Victor Oh, Don Plett, and Leo Housakos and their spouses. On this two week all-expense paid trip, the politicians were introduced to senior Chinese Communist Party officials and fêted, including at a lavish dinner at the five-star St. Regis Hotel in Beijing. 

During the years he was a backbench MP from 2008 to 2015, John McCallum, who subsequently served as ambassador to China for the Trudeau government, is reported to have enjoyed $73,300 in all-expense paid trips to China at the expense of Beijing-friendly groups prior to being appointed ambassador.

See also
Foreign electoral intervention
2019 Australian Parliament infiltration plot
1996 United States campaign finance controversy
Christine Lee
Legal dispute between former New Zealand Members of Parliament Simon Bridges and Jami-Lee Ross which stemmed from a donation to Bridges by Chinese businessman Yikun Zhang
Geng Tan
Jian Yang
Raymond Huo
Dio Wang
Sam Dastyari
Zhang Bin
Shenglin Xian

References

2019 in Canadian politics
2019 in international relations
Canada
Canada–China relations
2022 in Canadian politics
2022 in international relations
2019 Canadian federal election